Digi Snacks is the fourth solo studio album by American rapper and producer RZA; the third album under his Bobby Digital alias. Continuing the story from Digital Bullet, the album was released on June 24, 2008 on Koch Records. The album was originally titled Digi Snax, but it was changed before release.

The album's first single, "You Can't Stop Me Now," features fellow Wu-Tang Clan rapper Inspectah Deck; a track by this name featured in reports of early track listings of the group's 8 Diagrams album. RZA has since released another track, "Drama," featuring Monk of Black Knights and singer Thea van Seijen.

The album also features production from David Banner (on "Straight Up the Block", suggested to be the album's second single), from California producer Panauh Kalayeh and from King Tech, as well as live instrumentation from Wu-Tang Clan-affiliated funk/soul group Stone Mecca. The latter also backed RZA on a June–July tour of the US, which also featured surprise appearances by Wu-Tang members and affiliates, to accompany the album's release.

RZA described the album to Billboard.com as "simply fun hip-hop... a perfect blend of reality, fiction, sci-fi, and martial arts." The album cover's design was done by Gary Alford, and includes a brief comic within the sleeves.

Background

Production
The album's first single, "You Can't Stop Me Now," features fellow Wu-Tang Clan rapper Inspectah Deck; a track by this name featured in reports of early track listings of the group's 8 Diagrams album. The track samples a version of the Barrett Strong/Norman Whitfield composition "Message from a Black Man," also previously sampled by Mos Def on Undeniable in True Magic, MF DOOM on the King Geedorah album Take Me to Your Leader, and in the same year, sampled by Nas and producer Salaam Remi for "You Can't Stop Us Now," from the rapper's Untitled album.

Track listing

Notes
 International edition contains an extended version of track #3 "You Can’t Stop Me Now" 8:09. Contains additional vocals from U-God, Zu Keeper & Inspectah Deck.

Charts

References

External links
 

2008 albums
E1 Music albums
RZA albums
Wu Music Group albums
Albums produced by RZA
Albums produced by David Banner
Albums produced by George Drakoulias